Desmoceras is a genus of ammonites belonging to the family Desmoceratidae. These cephalopods were fast-moving nektonic carnivores. They lived in the Early Cretaceous; Albian epoch.

Species 
 Desmoceras alamoense
 Desmoceras argonauticum
 Desmoceras austeni
 Desmoceras barryae
 Desmoceras chimuense
 Desmoceras ezoanum
 Desmoceras inane
 Desmoceras latidorsatum
 Desmoceras pseudinane
 Desmoceras pseudouhligella
 Desmoceras uhligella

Distribution
Cretaceous of Angola, Antarctica, Australia, Canada, Colombia (Hiló Formation), Egypt, France, Germany, Italy, Japan, Madagascar (Mahajanga Province), Mexico, Morocco, Nigeria, Peru, Russia, United Kingdom, United States and Venezuela.

Gallery

References

External links
 Sepkoski, Jack Sepkoski's Online Genus Database – Cephalopoda
 Paleobiology Database

Ammonitida genera
Desmoceratidae
Cretaceous ammonites
Albian life
Early Cretaceous ammonites of North America
Ammonites of South America
Cretaceous Colombia
Albian genus extinctions